The Winston-Salem Police Department (WSPD) is the police department of Winston-Salem inside of Forsyth County, North Carolina, United States. The department consists of 559 sworn officers and 173 non-sworn officers. This Department serves the 5th largest city in the state, and is divided into 3 districts.

The department is run by the Chief of Police, and is assisted by 3 assistant chiefs. The Chief of Police reports directly to the City Manager and the Winston-Salem City Council. The Chief of Police is Catrina A. Thompson, who has been serving since 2017.

History
The WSPD was formed when the towns of Winston and Salem merged in 1913. When the towns merged, the Winston Police Department and the Salem Police Department also merged.

In 1967, a Winston-Salem policeman hit and killed a black man. Rioting broke out after his funeral on November 2 and lasted through the next night. The Winston-Salem Police and the National Guard unsuccessfully attempted to end the riots. At the time, the New York Times described these riots as "the worst outbreak of racial violence in North Carolina in this century."

In October of 2018, a white officer acting as a school resource officer was accused of slamming a black female student to the ground and arresting her without provocation. The student claimed that the SRO and school administration followed her, and the officer slammed her to the ground. This situation was compared to an incident that took place in South Carolina 2 years before, where and officer was seen flipping a student to the ground. The officer was wearing a body camera, but due to North Carolina law, a court order was required to release the footage. This order came a month later. This footage showed that the officer asked the student to 17 times to stop and come talk to him, and an independent investigation into the incident praised the officer for his de-escalation technique, and was found to have not broken department policy. The Ministers Conference Of Winston-Salem backed down from their calls for the officer to be fired once the footage was released, and praised the department for releasing the footage.

In the summer of 2020, Winston-Salem reacted to the murder of George Floyd, like many cities across the United States and World. The police response in Winston-Salem was different than in other cities, even within North Carolina. During the protests, Chief Thompson, who is black, appeared out of uniform, in civilian clothes and addressed the protesters. She made a promise that as long as the protests stayed peaceful, they would have the full support of the department, saying "I want to show the rest of America that our voices can and will be heard, and that can be done without tearing our city apart.” The protests in Winston-Salem remained peaceful throughout, even with a city population of 250,000. The protesters partnered with the police and local businesses to present a unified message, and this was praised by elected officials.

References

External Links  
Winston-Salem Police Department

 Winston-Salem, North Carolina
 Forsyth County, North Carolina
 Organizations based in Winston-Salem, North Carolina
 Municipal police departments of North Carolina
 1913 establishments in North Carolina